Brunel House or Brunell House may refer to:

Brunel House, Cardiff, UK
Brunel House, a Grade II-listed building on Westbourne Terrace, London
Governor's Club, also known as "Brunell House", at 11866 Magnolia Street in Magnolia Springs, Alabama, US
Brunell House (Jessamine St., Magnolia Springs, Alabama), a National Register of Historic Places listings in Baldwin County, Alabama, US